Wolzogen is surname of:
 Johann Ludwig von Wolzogen (1599, in Nové Zámky – 1661), Hungarian-born Austrian nobleman and Socinian theologian
 Caroline von Wolzogen, née von Lengefeld (1763–1847), German writer
Ludwig von Wolzogen (1773–1845), Prussian general
 Hans Paul von Wolzogen (1848, in Potsdam – 1938, in Bayreuth)
 Ernst von Wolzogen (1855–1934), a cultural critic, writer, and founder of Cabaret in Germany
Elsa Laura Wolzogen (1876-1945), German composer and lute player

German-language surnames
Swabian nobility